Laxalt is a Basque surname and may refer to:

 Adam Laxalt (born August 31, 1978), former Attorney General of Nevada
 Paul Laxalt  (August 2, 1922 – August 6, 2018), former American District Attorney, Lieutenant Governor of Nevada, Governor of Nevada and U.S. Senator
 Pedro Laxalt (May 13, 1900 – August 31, 1965), Argentine actor
 Robert Laxalt (September 25, 1923 – March 23, 2001), Basque-American writer
 Diego Laxalt (born February 7, 1993), Uruguayan footballer

See also

Basque-language surnames